Amos Vincent Ragsdale (December 14, 1854 – April 3, 1912) was an American politician in the state of Washington. He served in the Washington House of Representatives from 1891 to 1893, representing Spokane County. Ragsdale was born in the village of Ragsdale in Lucas County, Iowa on December 14, 1854 and became a real estate broker and dealer after moving to Spokane around 1885.

References

Members of the Washington House of Representatives
1854 births
1912 deaths